

II. Jagdkorps (2nd Fighter Corps) was formed 15 September 1943 in Chantilly from Höherer Jagdfliegerführer West. II. Jagdkorps was subordinated to Luftflotte 3, and from 26 September 1944 on to Luftwaffenkommando West. On 26 January 1945 the Corps was disbanded, and used to form the 14. Flieger-Divisionen and 15. Flieger-Divisionen. The headquarters was located at Chantilly and from August 1944 in Rochefort, from 10 September 1944 at Flammersfeld near Koblenz.

Commanding officers
Generleutnant Werner Junck, 15 September 1943 – 30 June 1944
General Alfred Bülowius, 1 July 1944 – 15 October 1944
Generalmajor Dietrich Peltz, 15 October 1944 – 26 January 1945
Generalmajor Karl-Eduard Wilke (acting), 12 January 1945 – 26 January 1945

Subordinated units

References

F004
Military units and formations established in 1943
Articles which contain graphical timelines
Military units and formations disestablished in 1945